Adam James Hall  (born 9 October 1987) is a New Zealand alpine skier and double Paralympic gold medalist.

Life
Hall was born in Dunedin on 9 October 1987 to Lindsay Hall, a dairy farmer, and Gayle Hall, née Paterson, an obstetric nurse.  He was diagnosed with spina bifida.

Hall competed for New Zealand at the 2006 Winter Paralympics, where he placed 41st in the men's downhill event, 43rd in the men's giant slalom and 50th in the men's Super-G, standing

At the 2010 Winter Paralympics, Hall won a gold medal in the men's slalom event, standing. He placed 8th in the men's super combined and 7th in the men's Super-G, standing.

At the 2018 Winter Paralympics, Hall again won a gold medal in the men's slalom event, standing, and also won a bronze medal in the super combined standing. He was also named as a co-recipient of the 2018 Whang Youn Dai Achievement Award.

In 2022, he won the silver medal in the men's standing slalom event at the 2021 World Para Snow Sports Championships held in Lillehammer, Norway.

Hall was appointed a Member of the New Zealand Order of Merit in the 2011 Queen's Birthday Honours, for services to sport.

References

External links 

  (archive)
 

1987 births
Living people
New Zealand male alpine skiers
Alpine skiers at the 2010 Winter Paralympics
Members of the New Zealand Order of Merit
Paralympic gold medalists for New Zealand
Paralympic bronze medalists for New Zealand
Sportspeople from Dunedin
Medalists at the 2010 Winter Paralympics
Medalists at the 2018 Winter Paralympics
People educated at Taieri College
Alpine skiers at the 2006 Winter Paralympics
Alpine skiers at the 2014 Winter Paralympics
Alpine skiers at the 2018 Winter Paralympics
Paralympic alpine skiers of New Zealand
Paralympic medalists in alpine skiing
Medalists at the 2022 Winter Paralympics
Alpine skiers at the 2022 Winter Paralympics